Nympho is the sixth studio album by the American electronic dance music producer Armand Van Helden, released in 2005.

Track listing
 "Nympho" (feat. Virgin Killer) – 4:15
 "Come Play with Me" (feat. Créme Blush) – 3:52
 "Into Your Eyes" – 3:59
 "Sugar" (feat. Jessy Moss) – 5:33
 "Brainwashing" (feat. Virgin Killer) – 6:04
 "Hear My Name" (feat. Spalding Rockwell) – 3:27
 "Hot City Nites" – 5:20
 "Jenny" (feat. Spalding Rockwell) – 6:23
 "When The Lights Go Down" – 5:10
 "Juicy Juicy" (feat. Virgin Killer) – 4:38
 "My My My" – 3:02
 "Got Over You" (feat. Virgin Killer) – 4:52
 "The Tear Drop" (feat. Tim Holtom) – 6:58

Charts

Release history

References

2005 albums
Armand Van Helden albums
Southern Fried Records albums